Col. Herbert T. Levack (March 14, 1916 – January 27, 2010) was a command pilot in the U.S. Air Force flying B-24s in 
World War II, and C-124s in Korea and Vietnam. He was also the Operations Officer for the first 
Operation Deep Freeze exploring the Antarctica. Mount Levack was named after him by the Advisory Committee on Antarctic Names (US-ACAN).

Early years
Herbert T. Levack was born on March 14, 1916, in Athol, Massachusetts, to Esther (Thompson) and Edmund Levack.
As a young man he moved to Hartford, Connecticut.

External links
Interview about Operation Deep Freeze

1916 births
2010 deaths
Operation Deep Freeze